The Fort Gibson Dam is a gravity dam on the Grand (Neosho) River in Oklahoma,  north of the town of Fort Gibson. The dam forms Fort Gibson Lake.  The primary purposes of the dam and lake are flood control and hydroelectric power production, although supply of drinking water to local communities, as well as recreation, are additional benefits.  The project was authorized by the Flood Control Act of 1941 and construction began the next year. During World War II construction was suspended and it recommenced in May 1946. In June 1949, the river was closed and the entire project was complete in September 1953 with the operation of the last of the power plant's four generators. Rights to construct the project originally belonged to the Grand River Dam Authority, but were seized by the U.S. Army Corps of Engineers in 1946.

Salient features

Dam

Spillway

Outlet works

Reservoir

Contractors 
First Contract: Al Johnson construction co. Winston brothers co. peter kiewit sons co. 608 Foshay Tower. Minneapolis, Minnesota

Second Contract: W. R. Grimshaw company. - Tulsa, Oklahoma

References

External links
 Sequoyah State Park - Oklahoma Tourism and Recreation Department
 Fort Gibson Lake Area - Oklahoma Tourism and Recreation Department

Buildings and structures in Cherokee County, Oklahoma
Buildings and structures in Wagoner County, Oklahoma
Dams in Oklahoma
Hydroelectric power plants in Oklahoma
Gravity dams
United States Army Corps of Engineers dams
Dams completed in 1946
Energy infrastructure completed in 1953
1953 establishments in Oklahoma